Aeros is a Ukrainian aircraft manufacturer founded by a group of ex-Antonov engineers in the early 1990s to build hang gliders. It is located in Kyiv.

The firm manufactures and distributes the French Best Off Sky Ranger ultralight under licence.

In the 2010s the company introduced a nanotrike, a lightweight, simple folding ultralight trike design, called the Aeros ANT, that can be packed into a carrying case.

Aircraft

 Aeros-1
 Aeros-2
 Aeros AC-21
 Aeros AL-12
 Aeros Accent
 Aeros Amigo
 Aeros ANT
 Aeros Combat
 Aeros Cross Country
 Aeros Discus
 Aeros Fox
 Aeros Fuego
 Aeros Mister X
 Aeros Phaeton
 Aeros Rival
 Aeros Sky Ranger
 Aeros Stealth
 Aeros Stalker
 Aeros Target
 Aeros Style
 Aeros Virtuoso
 Aeros Vitamin
 Aeros Zig-Zag

Wings
Aeros Combat
Aeros Discus T
Aeros Fox T
Aeros Profi
Aeros Stranger
Aeros Stream
Aeros Still

See also
Aero Nord

References

External links
 Company website

Aircraft manufacturers of Ukraine
Hang gliders
Manufacturing companies based in Kyiv
Ultralight trikes